Smokvica is a village in the City Municipality of Koper in the Littoral region of Slovenia.

The local church is dedicated to Mary Magdalene and belongs to the Parish of Movraž.

References

External links
Smokvica on Geopedia

Populated places in the City Municipality of Koper